Homer Bliss Dibell (January 17, 1864 – February 17, 1934) was an American jurist.

Born in Fillmore County, Minnesota, Homer moved with his family to Illinois and then to Wolcott, Indiana. Dibell graduated from Indiana University in 1889 and from Northwestern University School of Law in 1890. He had studied law in Logansport, Indiana. In 1890, Dibell settled in Duluth, Minnesota and was admitted to the Minnesota bar. He then practiced law in Duluth, Minnesota. In 1899, Dibell served as a Minnesota district court judge. Dibell then served on the Minnesota Supreme Court from 1918 until his death in 1934. Dibell died of a heart attack in a hospital in Saint Paul, Minnesota.

Notes

1864 births
1934 deaths
People from Logansport, Indiana
People from White County, Indiana
Politicians from Duluth, Minnesota
People from Fillmore County, Minnesota
Indiana University alumni
Northwestern University Pritzker School of Law alumni
Minnesota state court judges
Justices of the Minnesota Supreme Court